The third season of Pilipinas Got Talent premiered on ABS-CBN on July 9, 2011, two weeks after the grand finals of season two aired. Billy Crawford and Luis Manzano return as the hosts of the show. The three judges from the previous seasons reprise their roles.

Semifinals commenced on September 10, 2012, until October 16, 2012, with 12 acts qualified for the Grand Finals. The show ended on October 23, 2012, with Maasinhon Trio, a singing trio, of Southern Leyte proclaimed as winners winning the grand prize of 2 million pesos. On the other hand, Khalil Joseph Ramos of Parañaque ended as a runner-up, and Bringas Brothers of Davao del Sur as third placers with each had received a hundred thousand pesos. The other 9 grand finalists also received 50 thousand pesos as consolation prizes.

Auditions

The auditions for the third season took place in key cities in the Philippines. Major auditions were held in Baguio, Manila, Batangas, Cebu, Bacolod, Tacloban, Iloilo, Cagayan de Oro, Davao, and General Santos.

There were also mini-auditions in several cities and provinces in the Philippines including Laoag, Vigan, Tuguegarao, Apayao, Isabela, Baguio, Pangasinan, Cabanatuan, Tarlac, Baler, Manila, Laguna, San Pablo City, Lucena, Camarines Norte, Camarines Sur, Catanduanes, Albay, Sorsogon, Masbate, Mindoro, Puerto Princesa, Kalibo, Roxas City, Catarman, Catbalogan, Borongan, Ormoc, Dumaguete, Bohol, Camiguin, Iligan, Butuan, Bukidnon, Dipolog, Zamboanga, Kidapawan, Marbel, Digos and Mati. These mini-auditions are judged by Pilipinas Got Talent staff and those who passed will make it to the regional auditions.

In addition, online auditions was put up where contestants can upload their own audition video and send it to the website of Pilipinas Got Talent.

The show picked the best act "The One" every airing night to receive P5,000 sponsored by Head & Shoulders. Loverkada Kids became the first recipient of the award.

Successful auditionees
At the end of the auditions, a total 187 artists made it through the auditions and will proceed to the "Judges Cull".

Judges Cull
After the nationwide auditions (including online auditions), 187 acts made it to the next round called "The Judges Cull" where the judges were able to make a review of the contenders who passed the auditions which they are going to choose the top 36 semi-finalists. The Judges' Cull was held in ABS-CBN Studios in Quezon City where 24 acts from Luzon and Mindanao made it to the semi-finals. In addition, the 12 acts from Visayas were visited by the judges as well as Billy Crawford and Luis Manzano in their respective hometowns.

Top 36 results summary
Color key

Live shows

Semifinals
The Semifinals began on September 10, 2011, in PAGCOR Grand Theater in Parañaque, Metro Manila. Each week, performances from six acts took place on Saturday nights, while the results are announced during Sunday nights of which two acts will proceed to the grand finals. Often during results nights, guests are invited live to perform.

Semifinals summary
The order columns list the order of appearance each act made for every episode.
Color key

Week 1 (September 10 & 11)

Week 2 (September 17 & 18)

Week 3 (September 24 & 25)

Week 4 (October 1 & 2)

Week 5 (October 8 & 9)

Week 6 (October 15 & 16)

Finals (October 22 & 23)
The Grand Finals was held at the Ynares Sports Center in Antipolo on October 22 & 23, 2011. Several celebrities graced the show during the grand finals. Christian Bautista, Jed Madela, and Nina performed with the top finalist singers; The shows hosts' Billy Crawford and Luis Manzano performed a dance number; Gary Valenciano and son, Paolo Valenciano, with their rendition of "Come Together" of the Beatles; Kamikazee, a Filipino rock band, sang their own song called "Narda"; and season 2's grand winner Marcelito Pomoy performed a song number.

Performances & results

Television ratings
Television ratings for the third season of Pilipinas Got Talent on ABS-CBN are gathered from two major sources, namely from AGB Nielsen Philippines and Kantar Media - TNS. AGB Nielsen Philippines covers Mega Manila only, while Kantar Media - TNS covers most of the Philippines.

References

Pilipinas Got Talent
2011 Philippine television seasons